This is a List of libraries in the London Borough of Barnet

There are 15 council run libraries in the London Borough of Barnet, mobile library and home library services, and a local studies and archives library. The borough's local libraries have books, large print, books on tape, books on CD language courses, music CDs, DVDs, videos, newspapers, magazines, PC games, sheet music and vocal scores. Internet access is provided in all local libraries. The local studies and archives centre is in Mill Hill, providing reference access to local materials dating back to the 16th century and with a number of information sheets on local topics. Libraries in Barnet provide the specialist collections, within Greater London for Alzheimer's disease, art, cancer, Jewish interests and sociology.

The British Library has its newspaper section in the borough at Colindale.

References

External links
Local libraries in Barnet
East Finchley Library Users Group

 
Barnet
Lists of places in London